The women's 800 metre freestyle event at the 2010 Asian Games took place on 17 November 2010 at Guangzhou Aoti Aquatics Centre.

There were 12 competitors from 8 countries who took part in this event. 8 swimmers with the fast qualifying time were in the fast heat, the others were in the slow heat. The final ranking was arranged by the times from both heats.

Li Xuanxu and Shao Yiwen from China won the gold and silver medal respectively, Japanese swimmer Maiko Fujino won the bronze medal.

Schedule
All times are China Standard Time (UTC+08:00)

Records

Results

References
 16th Asian Games Results

External links 
 Women's 800m Freestyle Ev.No.32 Slow Heat Official Website
 Women's 800m Freestyle Ev.No.32 Fast Heat Official Website

Swimming at the 2010 Asian Games